Rasova is a commune in Constanța County, Northern Dobruja, Romania. It includes two villages:
 Rasova
 Cochirleni

The village of Rasova was the first capital of the Silistra Nouă County, which existed between 1878 and 1879.

Demographics
At the 2011 census, Rasova had 3,550 Romanians (99.97%) and 1 other (0.03%).

References

Communes in Constanța County
Localities in Northern Dobruja
Populated places on the Danube
Place names of Slavic origin in Romania